The Sweetest Sounds is an album by Swedish guitarist Rune Gustafsson with American saxophonist Zoot Sims recorded in late 1978 released by the Pablo Today label in the United States and Sonet Records in Sweden in 1979.

Reception

AllMusic reviewer Dave Nathan stated: "That this get together was a relaxed affair (as things usually were with Sims) is very apparent. The eight-song program includes nothing adventurous that would require much thinking or musical dexterity on the part of these experienced musicians. The many moods which characterized Sims' playing are evident here ... All in all, this was an entirely satisfactory proceeding".

Track listing
 "The Sweetest Sounds" (Richard Rodgers) – 4:00
 "Goodbye Yellow Brick Road" (Elton John, Bernie Taupin) – 4:45
 "Stompin' at the Savoy" (Edgar Sampson, Benny Goodman, Chick Webb, Andy Razaf) – 7:54
 "My Favourite Things" (Rodgers, Oscar Hammerstein II) – 4:40
 "Waters of March (Aguas de Marco)" (Antônio Carlos Jobim) – 5:25
 "Indentation" (Erik Nordström) – 4:50
 "I'm Gettin' Sentimental Over You" (George Bassman, Ned Washington) – 5:45
 "A Song for You" (Leon Russell) – 4:40

Personnel 
Rune Gustafsson, Bucky Pizzarelli – guitar
Zoot Sims – tenor saxophone
George Mraz – bass
Peter Donald – drums

References 

1979 albums
Zoot Sims albums
Rune Gustafsson albums
Pablo Records albums
Sonet Records albums